Westfield Manukau City is a major shopping centre located in Manukau, a southern district of Auckland, New Zealand. Annual sales for the full year 2018 were $293.4 million.

History and development 
The Manukau City Centre mall was built in 1972 by Fletcher Construction as part of the wider growth and development of the Manukau suburb. The mall was later acquired by the Westfield Group in 2001 and rebranded as Westfield Manukau.

Westfield Manukau has undergone several renovations and expansions, including the addition of a new food court and the development of a new cinema complex.

The centre was redeveloped in 1986 and 1992, by then owners National Mutual and Fletcher Challenge.

In late 2007, after a redevelopment, the centre had more than 170 stores and employed 1,458 staff.

See also
 List of shopping centres in New Zealand

References

External links
 Westfield Manukau City website

Shopping centres in the Auckland Region
Shopping malls established in 1976
Manukau City
Manukau City Centre
Ōtara-Papatoetoe Local Board Area